Jailbirds of Kerensky (Ptentsy Kerenskogo) was the informal term used during the Russian Revolution for people who were released from Russian jails on amnesty. A total of three amnesties were enacted by Russian Minister of Justice Alexander Kerensky in 1917. According to some historians, about 90,000 political prisoners were released along with an unknown number of non-political prisoners.

When Kerensky was appointed a minister of Justice in the newly established Russian Provisional Government, on  Russian Ministry of Justice abolished special civil courts, Okhranka (Russian secret police), and the Russian Gendarmerie. On  the Kerensky's ministry issued an order of political amnesty. Following that on  there was announced military amnesty and after three days the Ministry of Justice issued a ruling "On the relief of the fate of persons who have committed criminal offenses".

Following the amnesty, on 22 March 1917 bureau of the Central Committee of the Russian Social Democratic Labour Party (bolsheviks) adopted resolution about the Provisional Government which stated that the main task of Soviets is "universal arming of people and, in particular, immediate creation of the workers' Red Guards throughout the country". On 26 March 1917 this decision was published in the newspaper "Pravda".

See also
 Red Guards (Russia)

References

External links
 Syromiatnikov, N. "Jailbirds of Kerensky": the First Criminal Revolution in Russia («Птенцы Керенского»: первая криминальная революция в России). Russkaya 7. 5 January 2018
 Galperin, Ye. Jailbirds of Kerensky (Птенцы Керенского). Rabies of the Bastard. "Litres". 2017 

1917 in Russia
Clemency
Crime in Russia
Russian Provisional Government
Russian Revolution